The Apprentice Builders are the athletic teams of the Newport News Apprentice School, located in Newport News, in the U.S. state of Virginia. The school is unique in that it does not grant degrees and therefore is not a member of either the NAIA or the NCAA, but has regularly competed in multiple sports against other degree-granting institutions in the area. However, the Apprentice School is a full member of the United States Collegiate Athletic Association and competes in the Eastern Metro Athletic Conference (EMAC) for men's and women's basketball.

The school competes in the following sports:
 Baseball
 Men's basketball
 Women's basketball
 Football
 Men's golf
 Wrestling
 Women’s wrestling
 Cheerleading
 Drumline

Basketball
The men's basketball team has enjoyed historical success at Apprentice.  The 1937 men's basketball team won the Virginia State AAU Championship and qualified for the AAU Nationals in Denver, Colorado.

The school also fields a women's basketball team that has regularly competed nationally at their level.

Football

American football has been played at Apprentice since 1919, only breaking for two years during World War II.  The former coach is Phil Janaro, who has led the Builders to a record of 42 wins and 35 losses during his tenure.  Former NFL quarterback Norm Snead also served as a head coach.

Until the end of the 2010 season, Apprentice was a member of the Atlantic Central Football Conference, playing teams mainly in the NCAA Division III, although they also schedule games against NAIA teams. The program was briefly a member of the National Club Football Association (NCFA) for the 2018 season. Led by Head Coach John Davis, the Builders won the 2018 NCFA National Championship before transitioning back to an independent varsity schedule in 2019.

Wrestling
Wrestling at Apprentice competes in the National Collegiate Wrestling Association (NCWA) and the team won the Mid-Atlantic Conference Championship for the 2010 season.  The 2009 team, under head coach Bruce Shumaker, won the NCWA national championship.

References

External links